Allosteric serotonin reuptake inhibitor is a type of selective serotonin reuptake inhibitor (SSRI). Currently only escitalopram, the S stereoisomer of the SSRI citalopram is included in this category. It is based on the observation that the R isomer of citalopram can decrease the potency and inhibit the effects of the S isomer, probably through an allosteric interaction between two distinct, non-overlapping binding sites for the two different isomers on the serotonin transporter. Escitalopram, thus, binds not only to the primary site, but also to the allosteric site. From known SSRIs also paroxetine has action to the allosteric site, about half potency of escitalopram.

References 

 

Selective serotonin reuptake inhibitors